Doug and the Slugs are a Canadian pop music group formed in 1977 in Vancouver, British Columbia. The band enjoyed a number of Canadian top 40 hits in the 1980s, most notably "Too Bad" (1980), "Who Knows How To Make Love Stay" (1982), "Making It Work" (1983), "Day by Day" (1984) and "Tomcat Prowl" (1988). The song "Too Bad" served as the theme song for the 1999-2001 ABC sitcom The Norm Show, starring Norm Macdonald.

Band history
Doug and the Slugs was founded in Vancouver in 1977 by Toronto-born Doug Bennett, who had been a graphic designer in his home town before moving to British Columbia in the mid-1970s. Bennett served as the band's chief songwriter, frontman, and lead singer. Keyboardist Simon Kendall described Bennett's writing style: "He had some unique and very interesting lyrics. An anachronistic style, if you like. He was a bit of R&B, he was a bit 1940s, he was a bit Tex-Mex. As a writer, I think he deserves more credit than he gets for being intelligent. He wrote some beautiful and quite provocative songs."

After some turnover amongst Slugs in the early months, the lineup stabilized by 1978, and for the entirety of their recording career (1978–1992), Doug and the Slugs consisted of lead vocalist Doug Bennett, guitarists Richard Baker and John Burton, keyboardist Simon Kendall, bassist Steve Bosley, and drummer John "Wally" Watson.

In their early years, Doug and the Slugs had trouble getting club owners to book them due to their name. They entered a battle of the bands in Vancouver at the Body Shop, but lost. Hardly discouraged, the enterprising Bennett forged an underground following of dedicated fans by promoting his own dances at community halls (most notably the Commodore Ballroom) in Vancouver, and giving these dances attention-grabbing names like "Beach Blanket Bungle," "Secret Agent Man," and "The Last Upper." These Dances became hot ticket items due to their guaranteed-good-time status during 1978-1979. Doug and the Slugs also put on an annual outdoor dance festival known as "Slugfest."

The band built a solid following in the Vancouver area through constant live performances. Determined to exert control over their own music and artwork, the band founded their own record label, Ritdong Records, and worked out a distribution deal with RCA Records for their recordings (Bennett chose the name "Ritdong" because he described it as the sound produced by an out of tune guitar). Their debut 45 single "Too Bad" was issued on Ritdong in February 1980, and became a substantial hit in Vancouver, rising to #2 on local Top 40 station CKLG. Shortly thereafter, the track entered the Canadian hit parade, becoming a top ten hit. The song would also be used in the late 1990s as the theme song to the sitcom The Norm Show. That same year, Doug and The Slugs' manager, Sam Feldman mortgaged his house to make The Slugs debut album, Cognac & Bologna, that was recorded at Metalworks Studios in Mississauga, Ontario.

Throughout the 1980s, a string of singles and albums followed. Their biggest success was 1982's Music For The Hard Of Thinking, which in Canada peaked at #22, and spun off two top 40 singles:  "Who Knows How To Make Love Stay" and "Making It Work". However, the band didn't break through internationally, and RCA ended their distribution deal with Ritdong in 1984, after the release of the best-of compilation Ten Big Ones.

Ritdong then entered into a distribution deal with A&M Records. Two Doug and The Slugs albums were issued via this deal, 1984's Popaganda and 1988's Tomcat Prowl, as well as a Doug Bennett solo album, 1986's Animato, on which all the Slugs played. The 1988 single "Tomcat Prowl" became the band's final top 40 entry, peaking at #23.

Ritdong's deal with A&M expired after Tomcat Prowl, and the group didn't record for several years. Doug and The Slugs' final album, 1992's Tales From Terminal City, came out on their own Tomcat Records label. It is the only Doug and The Slugs album not to have hit the Canadian charts.

Most of the Slugs left the band after 1992, although Kendall stayed until 1994. After this time, Bennett toured with an ever-rotating cast of new musicians, still billing their act as Doug and the Slugs. The original Slugs reunited to back Doug for two "25th anniversary" shows in Vancouver in 2003.

Bennett acknowledged the fact that he was a heavy drinker, and eventually all of the years of playing bars and heavy drinking onstage compromised his health. He succumbed to liver cirrhosis after falling into a coma in October 2004, passing through Calgary from Saskatchewan. Kendall remarked that Bennett "hadn't been looking after himself. His health [had] not been good for the last couple of years, so it wasn't a total surprise. But nobody realized how sick he was."

Bennett and the band were profiled in the documentary film Doug and the Slugs and Me by director Teresa Alfeld, which had its world premiere at the 2022 DOXA Documentary Film Festival.

Band member timeline
The initial band members were (based on available information):

Other performers with the band (timelines unknown):

 drums
 Vince Ditrich
 Larry MacGillvary
 Jake Adams 
 Pat Steward
 guitar
 John Ellis
 Danny Latham Bass many years
 Graham Francis Guitar and vocals 1996
 Elio Martelli
 Al Rodger
 Tony Jenks
 keyboards
 Darrell Havers
 Dale Wallace 1995-1997
 Logan Dunster 2 Canadian tours 1995-1998 
saxophone
John Doheny

Graham Francis is alive and well and has played in numerous bands and has written many songs as well.
Dennis Henderson retired from being a high school electronics teacher at Hugh McRoberts Secondary School in Richmond, British Columbia, Canada. He also taught guitar at Hillcrest and Killarney Community Centres for 10 years. He still performs original roots-based folk music with his longtime partner, Barb Fraser, as "Fraser/Henderson".

The Season 3 episode of Da Vinci's Inquest, "It's Backwards Day" includes Simon Kendall' composition "Hymn For Unbelievers" from his album Sweet Compassion, as the episode closes, in place of the customary ending theme.

After a gap of several years, the original Slugs (Baker, Bosley, Burton, Kendall, and Watson) reunited in 2009 and invited singer Ted Okos to be their new frontman. The group still performs live dates as Doug and the Slugs, although now none of them is named Doug.

Discography

Studio albums

Compilation albums
1984: Ten Big Ones
1987: Doug and the Slugs (U.S. release only)
1993: Slugcology 101

Singles

Awards and recognition
1981: multiple nominee, Juno Award:
 Composer of the Year, "Too Bad"
 Best Album Graphics, Cognac and Bologna
 Single of the Year, "Too Bad"
1983: nominee, Juno Award, Most Promising Group of the Year

References

External links
 Official Doug And The Slugs website
 Entry for Doug And The Slugs at CanadianBands.com
 Doug And the Slugs at thecanadianencyclopedia.ca
 
 

2003 in Canadian music
Musical groups established in 1977
Musical groups disestablished in 2004
Musical groups reestablished in 2009
Musical groups from Vancouver
Canadian pop rock music groups
Doo-wop groups
Articles which contain graphical timelines
1977 establishments in British Columbia
2004 disestablishments in British Columbia
2009 establishments in British Columbia